Bhalki Assembly seat is one of the seats in Karnataka Legislative Assembly in India. It is a segment of Bidar Lok Sabha seat.

Members of Assembly

Hyderabad State
 1951: Kamtikar Murlidhar Rao Srinivas Rao, Indian National Congress

Mysore State
 1957 (Seat-1): Balwant Rao, Independent

 1957 (Seat-2): B. Sham Sunder, Independent

 1962: Bhimanna Shivlingappa, Praja Socialist Party

 1967: B. Shivalingappa, Indian National Congress

 1972: Subhash Asture, Indian National Congress

Karnataka State
 1978:	Bhimanna Khandre, Indian National Congress (Indira)

 1983:	Bhimanna Khandre, Indian National Congress

 1985:	Kalyanrao Sangappa Molakere, Janata Party

 1989:	Vijay Kumar Bhimanna Khandre, Independent

 1994:	Vijay Kumar Bhimanna Khandre, Indian National Congress

 1999:	Prakash Khandre, Bharatiya Janata Party

 2004:	Prakash Khandre, Bharatiya Janata Party

See also 
 List of constituencies of Karnataka Legislative Assembly

References 

Assembly constituencies of Karnataka
Bidar district